Mario Amar Rampersaud (born 24 November 1992) is a Barbadian cricketer who has played for the Barbadian national side in West Indian domestic cricket. He plays as a wicket-keeper.

Rampersaud first played for the Barbados under-19s in 2009, aged only 16. However, he did not make a senior appearance until the 2015–16 Regional Four Day Competition, aged 22. Rampersaud made his first-class debut in Barbados' first match of the tournament, against Guyana in November 2015, but had little impact.

In June 2021, he was selected to take part in the Minor League Cricket tournament in the United States following the players' draft.

References

External links
Player profile and statistics at CricketArchive
Player profile and statistics at ESPNcricinfo

1992 births
Living people
Barbadian cricketers
Barbados cricketers
Wicket-keepers